The Devon and Exeter Football League is a football competition based in England. It was established around 1900. The top division of this league, the Premier, sits at level 12 of the English football league system and is a feeder to the Devon Football League.

The league covers a 50 mile range from Exeter.

2022–23 members list by division

Premier
Alphington
Clyst Valley
Colyton
Crediton United II
Dawlish United
Elmore II
Kentisbeare
Lyme Regis
Okehampton Argyle II
Ottery St Mary II
Sandford
Sidmouth Town II
University of Exeter II

Division 1
Beer Albion II
Bow Amateur Athletic Club
Chard Town II
East Budleigh
Hatherleigh Town
Lympstone
Newton St Cyres
Newtown II
Teignmouth II
Topsham Town II
University of Exeter III
Upottery
Wellington II
Winkleigh

Division 2
Central
Clyst Valley II
Cranbrook
Devon Yeoman
Dunkeswell Rovers
Exmouth Spartans
Farway United
Feniton II
Otterton
St Martins
Tedburn St Mary
Tipton St John
University of Exeter IV
Westexe Park Rangers

Division 3
AFC Exe
Bampton
Bravehearts
Broadclyst
Chagford
Halwill
Heavitree United
Hemyock
Honiton Town II
Lyme Regis II
Seaton Town
South Zeal United
University of Exeter V
Witheridge

Division 4
Alphington II
Budleigh Salterton II
Cheriton Fitzpaine
Colyton II
Cullompton Rangers II
Culm United
Dawlish United II
East Budleigh II
Elmore III
Exeter United
Sidmouth Town III
St Thomas SC
University of Exeter VI
Uplyme

Division 5
Amory Green Rovers
Awliscombe United
Axmouth United
Bickleigh
Cranbrook United
Heart of Oak
Millwey Rise
St Martins II
Starcross Dons
Teign Village
Thorverton II
University of Exeter VII
Whipton & Pinhoe

Division 6
Beacon Knights
Central II
Cheriton Fitzpaine II
City Raiders
Cranbrook United II
Devon Yeoman II
Dolton Rangers
Morchard Bishop
Okehampton Argyle III
Ottery St Mary III
Sandford II
Upottery II
Witheridge II

Division 7
Bradninch
City Raiders II
Exeter Royals
Exmouth Rovers
Hatherleigh II
Newton St Cyres II
Otterton II
Phoenix
Priory
Seaton Town II
University of Exeter VIII
Westexe Park Rangers II
Whipton & Pinhoe II

Division 8
Amory Green Rovers II
Bampton II
Bow Amateur Athletic Club II
Ex Dons
Farway United II
Feniton III
Hemyock II
Lympstone II
Millwey Rise II
North Tawton
South Zeal United II
Starcross Dons II
Tedburn St Mary II

Recent champions

References

 
Football in Devon
1900 establishments in England
Football leagues in England
Sports leagues established in 1900